Sinje Irslinger (born January 30, 1996) is a German actress. Her work has generally been in television. Her credits include ,  and Der Lehrer.

External links

1996 births
German television actresses
Living people
Place of birth missing (living people)
21st-century German actresses
Actors from Cologne